In enzymology, a citrate—CoA ligase is an enzyme that catalyzes the chemical reaction

ATP + citrate + CoA  ADP + phosphate + (3S)-citryl-CoA

The 3 substrates of this enzyme are ATP, citrate, and CoA, whereas its 3 products are ADP, phosphate, and (3S)-citryl-CoA.

This enzyme belongs to the family of ligases, specifically those forming carbon-sulfur bonds as acid-thiol ligases.  The systematic name of this enzyme class is citrate:CoA ligase (ADP-forming). Other names in common use include citryl-CoA synthetase, citrate:CoA ligase, and citrate thiokinase.  This enzyme participates in citric acid cycle.

References

 
 

EC 6.2.1
Enzymes of unknown structure